Louise "Loes" Diana Wilhelmina Catharina Luca (born 18 October 1953) is a Dutch actress, singer and comedian. She began her career in the 1980s as a stage actress and singer in various musicals. She later started a successful film and television career, starring in Spetters, Het meisje met het rode haar, De Noorderlingen and Ja zuster, nee zuster. She also appeared in the television show 't Schaep met de 5 Pooten.

Personal life
Luca was born in Rotterdam. When she was seventeen she wanted to go to the Academie voor Expressie. Because she didn't speak French at the time and had only three years Mulo, after which she departed for France to become an au pair. Five years later she was admitted and she is now an official drama teacher.

Luca married in the 1980s and had one daughter (BAFTA and Sundance winning animation film director Nina Gantz) but divorced in 1992 after her husband had cheated on her. Until his death in 2008 she was in a relationship with Harald van der Lubbe (brother to De Dijk's Huub van der Lubbe).

In an interview with the Dutch Psychology Magazine, Luca disclosed that her father engaged in sexual activities with younger men during her youth. She added that this had strained her relationship with her father.

Theatre 
In the onewomanshow Moordwijven, Loes Luca depicts the racy story of five women fighting life's challenges in just a few scenes. Luca was nominated for the Theo d'Or, a theatre prize awarded annually to the best actress in a leading role. In March 2007 the production Sophie Tucker, The Last of the Red Hot Mama's premiered.

Discography 

In late 2006, Luca released a CD called Wenend in het portaal (crying in the porch), in which she sings old almost forgotten tear-jerkers.

Filmography

References

External links

1953 births
Living people
20th-century Dutch actresses
21st-century Dutch actresses
Dutch film actresses
Dutch stage actresses
Dutch television actresses
Dutch voice actresses
Entertainers from Rotterdam
Nationaal Songfestival presenters
Actors from Rotterdam